Edmund Petty (c. 1621 – 1661) was an English lawyer and politician who sat in the House of Commons  in 1660.

Petty was the son of Maximilian Petty of Thame, Oxfordshire, and his first wife Elizabeth Waller, daughter of Robert Waller of Beaconsfield. He matriculated at Oriel College, Oxford aged 15 on 22 January 1636. He entered Lincoln's Inn in 1637 and was called to the bar in 1644. He was recorder of Wycombe by 1651.

In 1660, Petty was elected Member of Parliament for Wycombe for the Convention Parliament. He only spoke once in parliament and was not re-elected in 1661.

Petty died at the age of 60 and was buried at Wycombe.

Petty married Frances and had a son and three daughters.

References

1620s births
1661 deaths
English MPs 1660
Alumni of Oriel College, Oxford
Members of Lincoln's Inn
People from Wycombe District